{{Infobox person
| name               = Alistair Bunkall
| birth_name         = Alistair Edward Julian Bunkall <ref name=BMD>'Births, Marriages & Deaths Index of England & Wales confirms name and birthdate and lists birthplace as Bristol. Publisher: General Register Office. Retrieved: 27 April 2021.</ref>
| birth_place        = Bristol
| birth_date         = 
| nationality        = British
| education          = Sherborne School, Dorset
| alma_mater         = University of BristolCity University, London
| occupation         = Journalist and TV News Correspondent
| employer           = Sky News
| notable_works      = Off the Record with Alistair Bunkall (podcast)
| title              = Middle East Correspondent of Sky News 
}}

Alistair Edward Julian Bunkall (born 1982, Bristol), is a British journalist, currently working as Middle East Correspondent for Sky News, the 24-hour television news service operated by Sky UK. He has occupied this position since July 2021. Alistair was previously Defence and Security Correspondent for seven years and reported from many conflicts around the world including Afghanistan, Yemen and the Islamic State insurgency in Iraq.

Early life and education
Bunkall was born in Bristol in February 1982, and grew up in the village of Buckland Newton in north Dorset in South West England.

Bunkall was educated at Sherborne School, a boarding independent school for boys, in the market town of Sherborne in Dorset in South West England, followed by the University of Bristol in the city of Bristol, also in South West England. He took a Post Graduate Degree at the City University in Central London, in 2004.

Early career

Bunkall is an experienced foreign correspondent, having reported from more than 30 countries during his career with Sky News, including the conflicts in Ukraine, Syria, Iraq, Yemen, Afghanistan, Gaza and West Bank.

He is also one of few western journalists to have reported from North Korea

After leaving Sherborne School, Bunkall gained work experience at the Dorset Echo, a local daily newspaper. While still at the University of Bristol, he worked for BBC Radio Bristol and BBC Somerset Sound. After completing his Post Graduate Degree at City University in London in 2004, he joined BBC News, and reported for the BBC One O'Clock News. He wen onto work in two ITV regions, initially as a Sports Correspondent: ITV Central and ITV Thames Valley, and for the CKNW radio station in the city of Vancouver in British Columbia, on the West Coast of Canada.

Sky News
Bunkall joined Sky News as a general news reporter in 2007. He has held various positions at the channel including as Business Correspondent, Political Correspondent & Defence and Security Correspondent. He is currently the channel's Middle East Correspondent.

He has reported from Sudan in the run-up to the crucial elections leading up to Independence, and on the Norwegian twin terror attacks in early 2011.

Bunkall also reported from Denmark after the attempted assassination of a Danish cartoonist.

In 2014 he was deployed to the Philippines in the aftermath of Typhoon Haiyan to report on the multi-national humanitarian relief effort.

He became Sky News Defence Correspondent in December 2012 and Middle East Correspondent in 2021. He has reported on the conflicts in Afghanistan, Iraq, Yemen, Syria, Ukraine and South Sudan. He has also reported from North Korea  and is known for his access into some of the UK's most secretive establishments including the nuclear deterrent, covert drone base and intelligence agencies. 
Bunkall has interviewed key world figures including Prime Ministers, NATO Secretary Generals, leading diplomats and military officers.

Bunkall has reported on elections in Pakistan, Israel, Turkey, the UK, South Sudan and the 2020 US Presidential election.

Since July 2019, Bunkall has run an independent podcast series, titled "Off The Record with Alistair Bunkall"'', where he interviews "some of the world's great leaders". Recent high-profile interviews include Sir Alex Younger, former Head of MI6.

Personal life
Bunkall is married to Kate. They live in the Middle East with their two children.

References

1982 births
Alumni of City, University of London
Alumni of the University of Bristol
Living people
People educated at Sherborne School
Journalists from Bristol
People from Dorset
Sky News newsreaders and journalists